Hendrik Davi (born 21 December 1977) is a French politician of La France Insoumise (NUPES) who has been representing Bouches-du-Rhône's 5th constituency in the National Assembly since 2022. He contested the same constituency in the 2017 election, but was narrowly defeated in the second round.

See also 

 List of deputies of the 16th National Assembly of France

References 

Living people
1977 births
Deputies of the 16th National Assembly of the French Fifth Republic
21st-century French politicians
La France Insoumise politicians
Members of Parliament for Bouches-du-Rhône
University of Provence alumni
Paris-Sud University alumni
Revolutionary Communist League (France) politicians